Paskardžiai (formerly) is a village in Kėdainiai district municipality, in Kaunas County, in central Lithuania. According to the 2011 census, the village had a population of 1 person.

Demography

References

Villages in Kaunas County
Kėdainiai District Municipality